Maqu may refer to: 

Maqu County, a county in Gansu, China
Maqu, Tibet
Nimu Maqu River, a river in Nyêmo County, Lhasa Municipality, Tibet